Same Same But Different is a 2009 German film, a love story starring David Kross and Apinya Sakuljaroensuk. It was directed by Detlev Buck. The script follows Benjamin Prüfer's 2006 autobiographical magazine article, later published as a novel in 2007.

The title of Same Same But Different is indeed an Asian-English phrase, mainly used in Thailand, although the film is set in Cambodia.

The film first premiered at the 62nd Locarno International Film Festival on 13 August 2009.

Plot
Benjamin (David Kross), a German high school student, is a backpacker on his first major tour. In a nightclub in Phnom Penh, he meets a young local girl, Sreykeo (played by Apinya Sakuljaroensuk), and rapidly falls in love with her. Ben opts for this love, even though Sreykeo turns out to be HIV positive and seems to be a prostitute. It is based on the true story of Sreykeo Sorvan and Benjamin Prüfer.

Cast
David Kross as Ben
Apinya Sakuljaroensuk as Sreykeo
Wanda Badwal as Lilli
Stefan Konarske as Ed
Jens Harzer as Henry
Anne Müller as Claudia
Michael Ostrowski as Alex
Marie Jung as Regula
Lucile Charlemagne as Marie
Julia Primus as Vanessa
Constanze Becker as Sibylle
Olli Dittrich as Ben's father
Gilla Cremer as Ben's mother
Em Boun Nat as Sreykeo's father
Ok Sokha as Sreykeo's mother
Anatole Taubman as the hotel manager

Award
Same Same But Different was shown at the 62nd Locarno International Film Festival on 13 August 2009; and entered in the festival competition, the "Variety Piazza Grande Award". This award is conferred by critics from the American entertainment magazine Variety to films that it considers have artistic qualities and international evaluation opportunities.

References

External links
 

2009 films
2009 romantic drama films
German romantic drama films
2000s German-language films
Films directed by Detlev Buck
Films set in Cambodia
Films set in Hamburg
Films about prostitution in Cambodia
2000s German films